The 1992–93 Liga Leumit, Israeli national soccer league season ended with Beitar Jerusalem winning the championship after being promoted in the previous season from Liga Artzit.

League standings

Results

First and second round

Third round

Promotion-relegation play-off
A promotion-relegation play-off between the 13th-placed team in Liga Leumit, Hapoel Petah Tikva, and the 4th team in Liga Artzit, Maccabi Jaffa.

Hapoel Petah Tikva won 5–1 on aggregate and remained in Liga Leumit.

References
Israel - List of Final Tables RSSSF

Liga Leumit seasons
Israel
1